Bhupender Yadav (born 30 June 1969) is an Indian politician who serves as the Union Cabinet Minister of Labour and Employment, Environment, Forest and Climate Change in the Government of India. He is the National General Secretary of the Bharatiya Janata Party. He is a Member of Parliament in the Rajya Sabha, representing the state of Rajasthan, a position he has held since 2012. He was reelected in April 2018.

Early life and career
Yadav was born in Ajmer, Rajasthan  on 30 June 1969. He received his Bachelor's degree and Bachelor of Laws degree from Government College, Ajmer.

He started as a student union leader and in 2000, he was appointed the general secretary of the Akhil Bhartiya Adhivakta Parishad, a lawyers’ organization and held this position until 2009. Prior to beginning his political career, he was an Advocate in the Supreme Court and also served as Government Counsel for important Commissions. He was the government counsel for the Liberhan Commission which investigated the 1992 demolition of the Babri Masjid and the Justice Wadhwa Commission which investigated the murder of Australian missionary Graham Staines.

Politics 
Yadav was appointed as National Secretary of Bhartiya Janata Party in 2010 by Nitin Gadkari, the then national party President. On 4 April 2012 he was elected as a Member of Parliament, Rajya Sabha. He then took charge as the National General Secretary of the Bharatiya Janata Party in 2014. Yadav was the war room strategist behind securing convincing victories for his party in the assembly elections of Rajasthan (2013), Gujarat (2017), Jharkhand (2014) and Uttar Pradesh (2017). Yadav is the BJP's in-charge for the 2020 Bihar Legislative Assembly elections. In July 2021, Yadav was inducted in the Modi Cabinet as a Cabinet Minister for Environment Forest & Climate Change and Labour & Employment. As the Minister of Environment Forest & Climate Change, he voiced India’s intervention to get the term ‘phase-out’ of coal changed to ‘phase-down’ in the final agreement of the 26th United Nations Conference of Parties (COP) in Glasgow. He stated that “developing countries have a right to their fair share of the global carbon budget and are entitled to the responsible use of fossil fuels.”

Parliamentary Committees 
Yadav's reputation as an expert on parliamentary select committees has earned him the title of "Committee Man". Most notably, he was the Chairman of the Joint Committee on Insolvency and Bankruptcy Code, 2015, and the Chairman of the Rajya Sabha Select Committee of the GST Bill.

Joint Committee on Insolvency and Bankruptcy Code, 2015 
The Insolvency and Bankruptcy Code, 2016 ("IBC"), which came into effect on May 28, 2016, is considered as an important legislation for early detection of financial sickness of any corporate debtor and to deal with such sickness in a time bound manner by allowing the implementation of the effective resolution plan, if the same is viable. IBC sought to address the lacuna in the existing banking regime and provide a consolidated framework for the insolvency of companies, limited and unlimited liability partnerships, and individuals.

In January 2019, the Supreme Court of India upheld the Insolvency and Bankruptcy Code, 2016 in its entirety, tossing out a batch of petitions that had challenged the constitutional validity of several provisions, including the one that has barred the promoters of defaulting companies and “connected persons” from bidding for stressed assets. The Code is being hailed for providing a mechanism for time-bound recovery of dues from insolvent debtors in India and for contributing to the ease of doing business in India. In the World Bank's latest Doing Business Report (DBR, 2019), India has recorded a jump of 23 positions against its rank of 100 in 2017 to be placed now at 77th rank among 190 countries assessed. In 2014, India had dropped to a dismal 142nd rank in DBR.

The IBC Parliamentary Panel also pitched for faster and enhanced payment of workmen dues and employee wages in the corporate insolvency process.

Other Committees 
Yadav has chaired 12 Parliamentary Committees, and been a member in multiple Parliamentary Committees:

Publication 
He is the coauthor, along with Ritwick Dutta, of Supreme Court on Forest Conservation (the second edition of which was published in 2007), a study of forest conservation in India. Yadav also co-authored ‘The Rise of the BJP: The Making of the World’s Largest Political Party’ with economist Ila Patnaik. The book, which traces Bharatiya Janata Party’s history, was published in December 2021.

References

Living people
1969 births
Rajya Sabha members from Rajasthan
People from Ajmer
Bharatiya Janata Party politicians from Rajasthan
Narendra Modi ministry